In algebraic geometry, a torsor or a principal bundle is an analog of a principal bundle in algebraic topology. Because there are few open sets in Zariski topology, it is more common to consider torsors in étale topology or some other flat topologies. The notion also generalizes a Galois extension in abstract algebra.

The category of torsors over a fixed base forms a stack. Conversely, a prestack can be stackified by taking the category of torsors (over the prestack).

Definition 
Given a smooth algebraic group G, a G-torsor (or a principal G-bundle) P over a scheme X is a scheme (or even algebraic space) with an action of G that is locally trivial in the given Grothendieck topology in the sense that the base change  along some covering map  is isomorphic to the trivial torsor  (G acts only on the second factor).

The definition may be formulated in the sheaf-theoretic language: a sheaf P on the category of X-schemes with some Grothendieck topology is a G-torsor if there is a covering  in the topology, called the local trivialization, such that the restriction of P to each  is a trivial -torsor.

A line bundle is nothing but a -bundle, and, like a line bundle, the two points of views of torsors, geometric and sheaf-theoretic, are used interchangeably (by permitting P to be a stack like an algebraic space if necessary).

It is common to consider a torsor for not just a group scheme but more generally for a group sheaf (e.g., fppf group sheaf).

Examples and basic properties 
Examples

 A -torsor on X is a principal -bundle on X. 
If  is a finite Galois extension, then  is a -torsor (roughly because the Galois group acts simply transitively on the roots.) This fact is a basis for Galois descent. See integral extension for a generalization.

Remark: A G-torsor P over X is isomorphic to a trivial torsor if and only if  is nonempty.

Let P be a G-torsor with a local trivialization  in étale topology. A trivial torsor admits a section: thus, there are elements . Different choices of  amount to 1-coboundaries in cohomology; that is, the  define a cohomology class in the sheaf cohomology (more precisely Čech cohomology with sheaf coefficient) group . A trivial torsor corresponds to the identity element. Conversely, it is easy to see any class in  defines a G-torsor on X, unique up to an isomorphism.

(Lang's theorem.)

Reduction of a structure group 
Most of constructions and terminology regarding principal bundles in algebraic topology carry over in verbatim to G-bundles. For example, if  is a G-bundle and G acts from the left on a scheme F, then one can form the associated bundle  with fiber F. In particular, if H is a closed subgroup of G, then for any H-bundle P,  is a G-bundle called the induced bundle.

If P is a G-bundle that is isomorphic to the induced bundle  for some H-bundle P', then P is said to admit a reduction of structure group from G to H.

Let X be a smooth projective curve over an algebraically closed field k, G a semisimple algebraic group and P a G-bundle on a relative curve , R a finitely generated k-algebra. Then a theorem of Drinfeld and Simpson states that, if G is simply connected and split, there is an étale morphism  such that  admits a reduction of structure group to a Borel subgroup of G.

Invariants 
If G is an algebraic group and E is a G-torsor, then the degree of instability of E is the degree of the inner form  of G induced by E (which is a group scheme over X); i.e., . E is said to be semi-stable if  and is stable if .

Examples of torsors in applied mathematics 
According to John Baez, energy, voltage, position and the phase of a quantum-mechanical wavefunction are all examples of torsors in everyday physics; in each case, only relative comparisons can be measured, but a reference point must be chosen arbitrarily to make absolute values meaningful. However, the comparative values of relative energy, voltage difference, displacements and phase differences are not torsors, but can be represented by simpler structures such as real numbers, vectors or angles.

In basic calculus, he cites indefinite integrals as being examples of torsors.

See also 
Beauville–Laszlo theorem
Moduli stack of principal bundles
Fundamental group scheme

Notes

References 
Behrend, K. The Lefschetz Trace Formula for the Moduli Stack of Principal Bundles. PhD dissertation.

Further reading 
Brian Conrad, Finiteness theorems for algebraic groups over function �fields

Algebraic geometry